The Piaggio P.23R, also known as the Piaggio P.123 for propaganda purposes, was an Italian commercial transport aircraft prototype designed and built by Piaggio.

Design and development
Piaggio designed the P.23R specifically to break speed records for commercial transport aircraft. It was a three-engine low-wing cantilever monoplane with twin tail fins and rudders. The three 671-kilowatt (900-horsepower) Isotta Fraschini Asso ("Ace") XI R V-12 engines were mounted in aerodynamically clean, sleek cowlings and each drove a three-bladed propeller. The fuselage was pencil-shaped.  The crew of two sat side by side in separate open cockpits, each protected by a windscreen.

The P.23R later was re-engined with three 746-kilowatt (1,001-horsepower) Piaggio P.XI RC.40 radial engines and its landing gear was modified. In addition, both cockpits were enclosed with canopies.

Operational history
The P.23R first flew in 1936.

The P.23Rs development was halted in 1939. During World War II, however, Allied aircraft recognition manuals erroneously identified it as a possible Regia Aeronautica (Italian Royal Air Force) bomber.

Variants
Although confusingly numbered as if it were a variant of the Piaggio P.23 commercial transport prototype of 1935, the P.23R was in fact an entirely new design.

Operators

Specifications (P.23R - Piaggio engines)

Notes

References

External links

AR Aircraft Manuals Blueprints Video Publications: Piaggio P.23R

P.023R
1930s Italian airliners
1930s Italian cargo aircraft
Trimotors
Low-wing aircraft
Aircraft first flown in 1936